The Gordon-Schaefer model is a bioeconomic model applied in the fishing industry. It may be used to compute the maximum sustainable yield. It takes account of biological growth rates, carrying capacity, and total and marginal costs and revenues.
 
This model can be applied in three primary scenarios: Monopoly; Maximum Sustainable Yield (biological optimum); and Open Access.

Monopoly
Profit maximizing firms, whether in monopoly or competitive markets, increase production to the point that marginal revenue = marginal costs. Monopoly firms produce less at higher prices than competitive markets.

Maximum sustainable yield
The maximum sustainable yield (MSY) is the largest amount of biomass that can be collected annually for indefinite periods. MSY assesses the productive capacity of the fishery, rather than demand or economic costs. MSY output may be greater or less than monopolistic or competitive output.

Open access
Open access is an unrestricted market. In open access, production in a given year is limited by demand and the costs of production without regard to that year's effects on future years. Open access markets can be competitive or monopolistic.

References

 
 
 Bioeconomía pesquera: teoría, modelación y manejo Por J. C. Seijo, Food and Agriculture Organization of the United Nations

Fisheries science
Resource economics
Sustainable fishery
Fisheries and Fishing articles needing expert attention